Denis Connaghan (born 9 January 1945, in Glasgow) is a Scottish former football goalkeeper, who played for Celtic, St Mirren, Morton and Clyde.

Connaghan began his career at Celtic, but was released in 1963. After a spell in junior football with Renfrew, he joined St Mirren in 1964, where he spent seven seasons and played over 100 league games. He re-joined Celtic in 1971 in the aftermath of Celtic's shock 4–1 loss to Partick Thistle in the Scottish League Cup final. Connaghan played in Celtic's 1974 Scottish Cup Final winning side, and also in the penalty shoot-out win over Rangers in the Drybrough Cup final later that same year. However, he never fully established himself and included only 32 league games before his departure in 1977.

After brief spells at Morton and Clyde, Connaghan returned to junior football in 1980 to play for Arthurlie, and he helped them reach the Scottish Junior Cup final, where they lost 1–0 to Pollok. Following his retirement from playing, he spent many years associated with Neilston Juniors in a number of backroom roles.

Personal life 
Connaghan's son Denis also became a footballer. He attended Holyrood Secondary School.

Honours
Celtic 
 Scottish League First Division: 1971–72
 Scottish Cup: 1973–74
 Drybrough Cup: 1974–75

References

External links 

Denis Connaghan at The Celtic Wiki, an external wiki
Denis Connaghan at North American Soccer League Players

1945 births
Living people
Footballers from Glasgow
Association football goalkeepers
Scottish footballers
Celtic F.C. players
St Mirren F.C. players
National Professional Soccer League (1967) players
Baltimore Bays players
Greenock Morton F.C. players
Clyde F.C. players
Scottish Football League players
Scottish expatriate footballers
Expatriate soccer players in the United States
Scottish expatriate sportspeople in the United States
Renfrew F.C. players
People educated at Holyrood Secondary School
Yoker Athletic F.C. players
Arthurlie F.C. players
Scottish Junior Football Association players